Muhammad bin Ibrahim (born 1956) was the 8th Governor of the Central Bank of Malaysia. He assumed the office of Governor on 1 May 2016, succeeding Zeti Akhtar Aziz. He tendered his resignation on 6 June 2018.

Education
Muhammad graduated from the Harvard Kennedy School from its Masters in Public Administration programme in 1993. He attended the six-week Advanced Management Programme at Harvard Business School in 2010. He earned a bachelor's degree in accounting from University of Malaya, and a postgraduate diploma in Islamic Banking and Finance from the International Islamic University Malaysia.

Career
Muhammad joined Bank Negara Malaysia in 1984, and appointed as Deputy Governor in June 2010. He sits on the Bank's Monetary Policy Committee as well as the Financial Stability Committee.

Throughout his service to the Central Bank of Malaysia, he held several posts in several government bodies and companies. He was a member of the board of directors of PETRONAS since 2010, and of the Malaysian Retirement Trust Fund since 2012. He is the chairman of the Asian Institute of Finance since 2016.

During the Asian Financial Crisis, he was the managing director of Danamodal Nasional Berhad, a bank recapitalization agency.

Muhammad was bestowed the Malaysian Federal Award Panglima Setia Mahkota by the Yang di-Pertuan Agong in 2017.

After the collapse of the Barisan Nasional (BN) administration and formation of the new Pakatan Harapan (PH) administration on 10 May 2018, Muhammad resigned almost a month later on 6 June 2018.

Honours

Honours of Malaysia
  :
  Commander of the Order of Meritorious Service (PJN) – Datuk  (2012)
  Commander of the Order of Loyalty to the Crown of Malaysia (PSM) – Tan Sri  (2017)
  :
  Knight Commander of the Order of the Crown of Selangor (DPMS) – Dato’ (2007)
  Knight Grand Commander of the Order of the Crown of Selangor (SPMS) – Dato’ Seri (2016)
  :
  Knight Grand Commander of the Order of the Life of the Crown of Kelantan (SJMK) – Dato’ (2016)

References

Harvard Kennedy School alumni
1956 births
Living people
Commanders of the Order of Loyalty to the Crown of Malaysia
Commanders of the Order of Meritorious Service
Governors of the Central Bank of Malaysia
Malaysian bankers
Malaysian Muslims
Malaysian people of Malay descent
Knights Grand Commander of the Order of the Crown of Selangor
Knights Commander of the Order of the Crown of Selangor
Malaysian economists